Shahrak-e Amir ol Momenin (also Romanized as Shahrak-e Amīr ol Mo'menīn; also known as ‘Abāreh) is a village in Shamsabad Rural District, in the Central District of Dezful County, Khuzestan Province, Iran. At the 2006 census, its population was 988, in 149 families.

References 

Populated places in Dezful County